Miloš Kosanović (born 28 May 1990) is a Serbian footballer who plays for Al Jazira.

Club career
He had played with Mladost Apatin in the Serbian First League between 2007 and 2010. In the summer 2010, he joined Polish club Cracovia on a four-year contract. In January 2016, he signed for Belgian club Standard de Liège. In August 2019, Kosanović has signed a two-year contract with Emirati club Al Jazira.

International career
Kosanović made his debut for Serbia national football team on 7 September 2015 in a friendly against France.

Style of play
As free kick specialist, Kosanović scored eighth goals from a free kick in just over a year and a half for Al Jazira.

Career statistics

Club

International

Honours
Standard Liège
 Belgian Cup: 2015–16

Al Jazira
 UAE Pro League: 2020–21
 UAE Super Cup: 2021

References

External links
 
 
 

1990 births
Living people
Serbian footballers
Serbian expatriate footballers
FK Mladost Apatin players
MKS Cracovia (football) players
K.V. Mechelen players
Standard Liège players
Göztepe S.K. footballers
Al Jazira Club players
Ekstraklasa players
Belgian Pro League players
Süper Lig players
UAE Pro League players
Expatriate footballers in Poland
Serbian expatriate sportspeople in Poland
Expatriate footballers in Belgium
Serbian expatriate sportspeople in Belgium
Expatriate footballers in Turkey
Serbian expatriate sportspeople in Turkey
Serbian expatriate sportspeople in the United Arab Emirates
Expatriate footballers in the United Arab Emirates
Association football defenders
Serbia under-21 international footballers
Serbia international footballers